Peikkarumbankottai is a village in the Orathanadu taluk of Thanjavur district, Tamil Nadu, India.

Demographics

Peikkarumbankottai is a small village located in Orathanadu of Thanjavur district, Tamil Nadu with total 600 families residing. The Peikkarumbankottai village has population of 1600 of which 768 are males while 832 are females as per Population Census 2011.

In Peikkarumbankottai village population of children with age 0-6 is 154 which makes up 9.63% of total population of village. Average Sex Ratio of Peikkarumbankottai village is 1083 which is higher than Tamil Nadu state average of 996. Child Sex Ratio for the Peikkarumbankottai as per census is 1000, higher than Tamil Nadu average of 943.

Peikkarumbankottai village has lower literacy rate compared to Tamil Nadu. In 2011, literacy rate of Peikkarumbankottai village was 77.32% compared to 80.09% of Tamil Nadu. In Peikkarumbankottai Male literacy stands at 87.84% while female literacy rate was 67.68%.

As per constitution of India and Panchyati Raaj Act, Peikkarumbankottai village is administrated by Sarpanch (Head of Village) who is elected representative of village.

As per the 2001 census, Peikkarumbankottai had a total population of 1491 with 692 males and 799 females. The sex ratio was 1155. The literacy rate was 61.96.
Just 30 km from Thanjavur, Pattukkottai 15 km, and Orathanadu 7 km.

Peikkarumbankottai is well connected by roads and railways with other parts of India and with cities and towns in Tamil Nadu. The nearest airport is Tiruchirapalli International Airport, located at a distance of 80 kilometres.[2] The nearest seaport is Nagapattinam, which is 84 kilometres (52 mi) from Thanjavur.

Peikkarumbankottai Thamizhannai Volleyball Club
Peikkarumbankottai Thamizhannai Volleyball club continually 22 year conduct state level volleyball Tournament in Thanjavur district. Thamizhannai Volleyball Good Team in the Thanjavur district. Every Year May Month Contact State level Volleyball match in Peikkarumbankottai By Thamizhannai Volleyball Club Peikkarumbankottai

Kovil

 Arulmighu Ayyanar Kovil
 Arulmighu Vinayagar kovil
 Arulmighu Pattavar Kovil
 Arulmighu Kamaan Kovil
 Arulmighu Kudikadu Mariamman Kovil 
 Arulmighu ThirugnanaSamantha Moorthy Kovil

Nearby towns

Orathanadu(Kallar Nadu) - 7 km southeast
Pattukkottai - 18 km southeast
Thanjavur    - 28 km west
Tiruchirappalli - 80 km west
Kumbakonam - 70 km North east
Thiruvaiyaru - 43 km northwest
Tiruvarur - 40 km east
Nagappattinam - 84 km east
Mannargudi- 25 km east
Perambalur - 70 km northwest
Vailankanni - 96 km east
Vedaranyam - 100 km southeast
Pudukkottai - 55 km south
Muthupetti  - 25 km east

Economy

The major occupation of the inhabitants of the town is tourism and service-oriented industry, while the traditional occupation is agriculture.

Thanjavur is known as the "Rice bowl of Tamil Nadu". Paddy is the crops and the other crops grown are Blackgram, Banana, Coconut, Gingelly, Ragi, Red gram, Green gram, Sugarcane and Maize. The total percentage of land fit for cultivation is 58%.[32] There are three seasons for agriculture in Thanjavur - Kuruvai (June to September), Samba (August to January) and Thaladi (September, October to February, March).[33] The total rice production has been maintained at 10.615 L.M.T and 7.077 L.M.T.[32] The town acts as a focal point for food grains transported from the adjoining areas of the Cauvery Delta. Organic farming is gradually being known to the farmers of Thanjavur. In order to maximize agricultural produce organic farming is being implemented.

Thanjavur city is an important centre of silk weaving and manufacture of musical instruments. There were 200 silk-weaving units in the city in 1991 with around 80,000 people working in them.[34] The sarees produced in the villages surrounding Thanjavur are sold in Thanjavur and neighbouring towns.[34] Increasing production costs and competition from large-scale producers have reduced the number of people involved in the production

Transport

Peikkarumbankottai, in modern times, is well-connected with Chennai, Coimbatore, Tirupur, Vellore, Erode, Tiruchirappalli, Madurai, Kumbakonam, Pattukkottai, Dindigul Pudukkottai, Tirunelveli, Bangalore, Ernakulam, Nagercoil, Tirupathi, Thiruvananthapuram, Ooty and through regular bus services. Previously, Thanjavur had a single bus terminus located at the heart of the city. The National Highways 67,[40] 45C,[40] 226[40] and 226 Extn[40] pass through the city. An integrated bus terminus, called New Busstand has been constructed near the Serafoji College in order to handle the passenger traffic. Thanjavur also has a well-maintained sub-urban public transport system. Government and private buses operate frequently between the two bus termini and other towns and villages like Vallam, Budalur, Pillaiyarpatti, Vallam Pudursethi, Sengipatti, Vadakkur North and Kuruvadipatti.

Peikkarumbankottai is connected by rail with most important cities and towns in India. This district has 122.07 Kilometers of Broad gauge railway lines with 20 Railway stations connecting Thanjavur to Major centres in the state. There are daily trains from/to Chennai,[41][42][43] Bangalore,[44] Mysore,[41] Ernakulam,[45] Thrissur,[45] Palakkad,[45] Coimbatore,[41][45] Erode,[45] Tirupur,[45] Tiruchirapalli,[43] Salem, Karur,[45] Madurai, Tirunelveli, Rameswaram, Tiruchendur,[43] Dharmapuri and weekly trains to Tirupati, Visakhapatnam, Goa,[43] Vijayawada, Nagpur, Jabalpur, Allahabad, Varanasi, Bhubaneshwar[43][46] and to all main cities.

In the early 1990s, Peikkarumbankottai (Thanjavur) was connected with Chennai via the Vayudoot flight service, which was stopped due to poor patronage. A full-fledged Air Force Station is operational at Thanjavur which stations several Fighter (aircraft) including Sukhoi jets.[47] Thanjavur Air Force Station started functioning as a major air base by 2012,[48] The base will be developed to handle Fighter, Transport aircraft and also Refuelling aircraft.[48] The nearest Airport is Tiruchirapalli International Airport.

Education

Peikkarumbankottai is well known for its culture and education. Peikkarumbankottai  (Thanjavur) has a total of 4 Universities as Tamil University,[72] SASTRA University,[73] PRIST University,[74] Periyar Maniammai University.[73] The Tamil University is a state run institute, started during 1981 and got the statutory recognition from the University Grants Commission in 1983.[75] It is one of its kind for the Tamil language doing higher research in Tamilology and advanced study in various other allied branches like linguistics, translation, lexicography, music, drama and manuscriptology.[75][76]

Peikkarumbankottai (Thanjavur) has a total of 15 Arts, Science & Management colleges and 9 Engineering Colleges in the City. Thanjavur have its own Medical College as Thanjavur Medical College which was established in 1959. The Paddy Processing Research Centre (PPRC) later became the Indian Institute of Crop Processing Technology (IICPT) in 2008 and is a hub for food processing research.

References 

https://www.Peikkarumbankottaikallarkottai.blogspot.in
https://www.facebook.com/peikkarumbankottai.kallarkottai

Villages in Thanjavur district